The 2020 Trofeo Laigueglia was a one-day road cycling race that took place on 16 February 2020 in and around Laigueglia. It was the 57th edition of the Trofeo Laigueglia and was rated as a 1.Pro event as part of the 2020 UCI Europe Tour and the 2020 UCI ProSeries. 

The race was won by Giulio Ciccone racing for the Italian national team.

Teams
Nineteen teams were invited to the race. Along with an Italian national team, there was one UCI WorldTour team, seven UCI Professional Continental teams, and ten UCI Continental teams. Of the starting peloton of 127 riders, only 56 finished.

UCI WorldTeams

 

UCI Professional Continental Teams

 
 
 
 
 
 
 

UCI Continental Teams

 
 
 
 
 
 
 
 
 
 

National Teams
 Italy

Result

References 

Trofeo Laigueglia
Trofeo Laigueglia
Trofeo Laigueglia
2020
Trofeo Laigueglia